Traces o' Red is the debut album by Norwegian black metal band Enslavement of Beauty. It was released in 1999. All music was composed by Tony Eugene Tunheim, and all lyrics were written by Ole Alexander Myrholt except for "Dreams", a poem from 1827 by Edgar Allan Poe. Cover Designe was by Sten Brian Tunheim.

Track listing

In Thro' the Cave of Impressions – 1:29
Traces o' Red – The Fall and Rise of Vitality – 4:30
Be Thou My Lethe and Bleeding Quietus – 4:31
Dreams – 4:25
Something Unique – 4:14
The Poem of Dark Subconscious Desire – 5.05
Eerily Seductive – 4.32
My Irreverent Pilgrimage – 4:14
And Still I Wither – 5:14
I Dedicate My Beauty to the Stars – 11.09
The Masquerade of Rhapsody (Japanese bonus track) – 3:36
Colleen (Japanese bonus track) – 1:54

Musicians
 Ole Alexander Myrholt – Vocals
 Tony Eugene Tunheim – Guitar, Keyboard

Other personnel
 Sten Brian Tunheim – Cover Art
 Fred Endresen – Engineer, Mixing, Sampling, Producer

External links
 MySpace
 Ecyclopaedia Metallum

1999 debut albums
Enslavement of Beauty albums